Máirín Diamond (born 1957), is an Irish poet.

Diamond grew up in Renvyle, County Galway, and she studied Literature and Philosophy at the University of Sussex in England. She presently lives in Dublin.

Her collection, The Testimony of Bones, which was begun in 1984, is a cycle of three poems. It focuses on the Great Famine (Ireland) as the defining event of modern Irish history.

Bibliography

 The Testimony of Bones, Wideawake Press, Dublin, 2000. 
 Rock Shadow, 2005.

References
 https://www.scribd.com/doc/12590232/Light-of-Love
 https://openlibrary.org/a/OL1615178A/Ma%CC%81iri%CC%81n_Diamond

Irish poets
Living people
Irish women poets
Irish expatriates in England
People from County Galway
1957 births
Alumni of the University of Sussex